The Juno Award for "R&B/Soul Recording of the Year" was awarded from 1985 to 2020, as recognition each year for the best rhythm and blues/soul album in Canada. Beginning with the Juno Awards of 2021, it was split into two new categories for Contemporary R&B/Soul Recording of the Year and Traditional R&B/Soul Recording of the Year.

Winners

Best R&B/Soul Recording (1985 - 2002)

R&B/Soul Recording of the Year (2003 - Present)

References 

RandB Soul Recording